Ward and Al is a talk radio show based out of Canada. It is exclusively available on SiriusXM on the channel Canada Talks. The co-hosts are comedians Ward Anderson and Allison Dore. The show airs from 1-4pm Eastern and is available on SiriusXM's mobile App.

Canadian talk radio programs